Diplomatic relations between South Korea and the United States commenced in 1950, when the United States helped establish the modern state of South Korea, also known as the Republic of Korea, and fought on its UN-sponsored side in the Korean War (1950–1953). During the subsequent four decades, South Korea experienced tremendous economic, political and military growth.

South Korea has a long military alliance with the United States, aiding the U.S. in every war since the Vietnam War, and most recently during the Iraq War. At the 2009 G20 London summit, U.S. President Barack Obama called South Korea "one of America's closest allies and greatest friends." In 1989, South Korea was among the first batch of countries to be designated as a major non-NATO ally.

According to academics David Shambaugh and Michael Yahuda, there are currently several security factors shaping the alliance:
 The challenges posed by North Korea's nuclear and missile program and the potential of weapons proliferation to other states,
 The impact of peace and reunification developments on the Korean peninsula on the strategic relationship between the United States and China
 The potential impact of events on the Korean peninsula on Japan and Sino-Japanese rivalry.

South Korea is currently one of the most pro-American countries in the world. According to a 2018 Pew survey, 77% of South Koreans had a favorable view of the United States, while 21% had a negative view. According to a 2018 Gallup poll, 77% of Americans had a favorable view of South Koreans, while 22% had a negative view.

However, signs indicate S.K.-U.S. relations may be simultaneously strengthening, as cultural exchange (see also TALK program), developments in media partnership (See Parasite Oscar win), and a strong trade in goods and services continues. South Korea is also a top destination of U.S. military hardware, with a recent deal in August 2019 for Seahawk helicopters topping 800 million dollars.

The former US Ambassador to South Korea, Harry Harris, arrived in Seoul on July 7, 2018. The post had been vacant since President Donald Trump took office in January 2017. Harris, a former head of the US military's Pacific Command, has expressed his resolve to work as an ambassador to strengthen the alliance between the United States and South Korea.

Country comparison 
Leaders of South Korea and the United States from 1950

Historical background 
 
Following the United States expedition to Korea in 1871, the United States and Korea's Joseon Dynasty established diplomatic relations under the 1882 Treaty of Peace, Amity, Commerce, and Navigation, a 1905, when Japan assumed direction over Korean foreign affairs. In 1910, Japan began a 35-year period of colonial rule over Korea.

Following Japan's surrender to the Allies in 1945, at the end of World War II, the Korean Peninsula was divided at the 38th parallel into two occupation zones, with the United States in the South and the Soviet Union in the North. Initial talks in 1945–6 to achieve a unified, independent Korea were not successful, and in 1948 two separate nations were established  – the Republic of Korea (ROK) in the South, and the Democratic People's Republic of Korea (DPRK) in the North. On January 1, 1949, the United States officially recognized the Republic of Korea as the sole legitimate government of Korea and established diplomatic relations on March 25 of that year.

Korean War (6.25 War) 

Cross-border skirmishes and raids at the 38th Parallel escalated into open warfare when the North Korean forces invaded South Korea on June 25, 1950. In response, 16 member countries of the United Nations, including the United States, came to the defense of South Korea. It was the first significant armed conflict of the Cold War with extensive deployment of U.S. and other troops.

Origins of the South Korea–United States alliance 

Following the end of World War II, the United States established a bilateral alliance with South Korea instead of establishing a multilateral alliance with South Korea and other East Asian countries.

Moreover, the "U.S. alliance with South Korea would consequently have three functions. First, it would serve as part of a network of alliances and military installations designed to ring the Soviet threat in the Pacific. Second, it would deter a second North Korean attack, with U.S. ground troops serving as the "tripwire" guaranteeing U.S. involvement. Third, it would restrain the South from engaging in adventurism."

The United States and South Korea are allies under the 1953 Mutual Defense Treaty. Under the agreement, U.S. military personnel have maintained a continuous presence on the Korean peninsula.

US military in Korea 

South Korea and the United States agreed to a military alliance in 1953. They called it "the relationship forged in blood". In addition, roughly 29,000 United States Forces Korea troops are stationed in South Korea. In 2009, South Korea and the United States pledged to develop the alliance's vision for future defense cooperation. Currently, South Korean forces would fall under United States control should the war resume. This war time control is planned to revert to South Korea in 2022.

At the request of the United States, President Park Chung-hee sent troops to Vietnam to assist American troops during the Vietnam War, maintaining the second largest contingent of foreign troops after the United States. In exchange, the United States increased military and economic assistance to South Korea. In 2004, President Roh Moo-hyun authorized dispatching a small contingent of troops to Iraq at the request of U.S. President George W. Bush.

Since 2009, air forces of South Korea and the U.S.A. have conducted annual joint exercises under the name "Max Thunder". In 2018 the drills began on May 11 and continued until May 17.

At a Cabinet meeting in Seoul on 10 July 2018 the government decided not to hold that year's Ulchi drill, scheduled for June 2018. The Government said the decision was made in line with recent political and security improvements on the peninsula and the suspension of South Korea-U.S. joint military exercises.

Former South Korean President Moon Jae-in, elected in May 2017, has said he supports the continuation of sanctions against North Korea if it is aimed at bringing North Korea out of its state of isolation and to the negotiating table. He also argued, at the same time, that he was against a "sanctions-only" approach toward North Korea. His approach to North Korea is similar to Kim Dae-jung's Sunshine Policy, which only continued up to the Roh Mu-hyun's administration.

In 2018 there were several rounds of talks regarding sharing the cost of U.S forces in South Korea. These reflect Washington's desire for South Korea to share a "greater burden" of the costs of the military deployment. On February 10, 2019, South Korea and the United States confirmed that a year long deal for keeping American troops, numbering 28,500, in South Korea had been made. This was in exchange for South Korea paying 925 million dollars to the United States.

In terms of American leadership,  Bill Clinton and George W. Bush both emphasized the Middle East over North Korea. Clinton had deep emotional ties with Israel but neglected North Korea issues and never built strong personal relations with South Korean leaders. Bush, whose religious fundamentalism led him to divide the world into good and evil, had a personalized hatred for North Korean leader Kim Jong-il, but he also had frosty relations with South Korean leaders.

In his 2021 New Year’s press conference on January 18, President Moon Jae-in stated that the two Koreas might be able to discuss the U.S.-South Korea military drills through a joint inter-Korean military committee. However, U.S. officials expressed that it is not a topic to be decided by Pyongyang, and that scaling down the exercises was not desirable.

In May 2022, President Joe Biden and President Yoon Suk Yeol agreed in talks to begin discussions on restarting and potentially expanding joint military training on and around the Korean Peninsula. The move was a signal that
Biden was changing course from former President Donald Trump's positions in Asia.

Nuclear and missile diplomacy

Between 1958 and 1991, the United States based a variety of nuclear weapons in South Korea. The number reached a peak of 950 warheads in 1967. Since 1991, when President George H. W. Bush announced the withdrawal of all tactical nuclear weapons based abroad, the Korean peninsula has seen ongoing efforts by the U.S. to negotiate an end to North Korea's own nuclear and missile development. These efforts have been characterized by "stalemates, crises and tentative progress." Despite the ongoing tensions, the U.S. has not redeployed nuclear weapons, although one recent press report suggests a majority of South Koreans are in favor of developing their own nuclear weapons. South Korea announced the deployment of the Terminal High Altitude Area Defense anti-ballistic missile defense system at the end of 2017.

Opinion polls 

According to Pew Research Center, 84% of South Koreans have a favorable view towards the United States and Americans (ranked within top 4 among the countries in the world). Also, according to a Gallup Korea poll, South Korea views the U.S. as the most favorable country in the world. On the political side, the United States supported South Korea after 1945 as a "staunch bastion against communism", even when the ROK itself was ruled by a US-backed dictatorship. In a March 2011 Gallup Poll, 74% of South Koreans said that they believe that the U.S. influence in the world is favorable, and in a November 2011 Gallup Poll, 57% of South Koreans approved of U.S. leadership, with 22% disapproving. In a 2011 Gallup poll, a 65% favorability rating, the highest rating to date.

According to a 2014 BBC World Service Poll, 58% of South Koreans view U.S. influence positively, the highest rating for any surveyed Asian country.

As relations with Korea waxed hot and cold under President Donald Trump, American public opinion regarding North Korea likewise fluctuated sharply, and no clear picture emerges.

Anti-American sentiment in South Korea

US military and the sex trade 

In 1953, at the end of the Korean War, the number of prostitutes in South Korea was estimated as about 350,000, with about 60 percent working near U.S. military camps. In the post-Korean War period, the U.S military continued to contribute significantly to the South Korean economy, providing an estimated 1 percent of the South Korean GNP in 1991, including the sex industry. Despite the world-wide growth of women's human rights advocacy since the 1990s, and the shift towards foreign workers providing sex services for U.S troops, (particularly women trafficked from the Philippines and the former Soviet Union), prostitution via "juicy bars" remains an issue near U.S. bases in South Korea.

1992 Yun Geum-i murder 

In 1992, Yun Geum-i, a 26-year-old woman, was brutally killed by a U.S. serviceman, Private Kenneth L. Markle, in Dongducheon. In August 1993, the U.S. government compensated the victim's family with a payment of about US$72,000. Markle was sentenced by a South Korean court to life imprisonment, later reduced to 15 years. Professor Katharine Moon notes that the murder was not unique, and did not spark a national debate about the presence of U.S. forces. However, it did become a "call to action" for some Koreans, and led to the establishment of the "National Campaign for the Eradication of Crimes by U.S. troops."

Environmental degradation 
In July 2000, the Eighth U.S. Army apologized for an incident where formaldehyde, a toxic fluid, was released into the Han River in February of that year. In a report released in 2017 detailing spill incidents from 1995 to 2015 at the US garrison in Yongsan, South Korean environmentalist groups expressed concern about the lack of transparency and the possibility of continued water contamination, as well as who would take responsibility for cleanup of the site.

Yangju highway incident 

On 13 June 2002, two 14-year-old South Korean schoolgirls were crushed to death by a 50-ton United States Army vehicle in Yangju. Anti-Americanism was pervasive after the driver and the navigator of the vehicle were both acquitted in U.S. courts-martial on charges of negligent homicide. There was resentment from protesters towards the U.S.–South Korea Status of Forces Agreement, which restricted South Korea from having jurisdiction over alleged crimes that occurred when American soldiers were on official duty. South Korean presidential candidate Lee Hoi-chang called on United States President George W. Bush to "apologize to soothe the pain of the Korean people and to prevent any escalation in anti-American sentiment". American ambassador to South Korea Thomas C. Hubbard apologized on behalf of Bush.

2008 beef protests in South Korea 

The Government of South Korea banned imports of U.S. beef in 2003 in response to a case of mad cow disease in Washington state. In 2008, the protests against U.S. beef recalled the student "pro-democracy" movements of the 1980s. Nevertheless, by 2010 South Korea had become the world's third largest U.S. beef importer. With its strong import growth, South Korea surpassed Japan for the first time to become the largest market for U.S. beef in Asia and in 2016 US beef imports in Korea reached a value of $1 billion.

2015 attack on the United States Ambassador 
At about 7:40 a.m. on March 5, 2015, Mark Lippert, United States Ambassador to South Korea was attacked by a knife-wielding man at a restaurant attached to Sejong Center in downtown Seoul, where he was scheduled to give a speech at a meeting of the Korean Council for Reconciliation and Cooperation. The assailant, Kim Ki-jong, is a member of Uri Madang, a progressive cultural organization opposed to the Korean War. He inflicted wounds on Lippert's left arm as well as a four-inch cut on the right side of the ambassador's face, requiring 80 stitches. Lippert underwent surgery at Yonsei University's Severance Hospital in Seoul. While his injuries were not life-threatening, doctors stated that it would take several months for Lippert to regain use of his fingers. ABC News summarized the immediate aftermath of the attack as follows: "Ambassador Lippert, an Iraq war veteran, defended himself from the attack. Lippert was rushed to a hospital where he was treated for deep cuts to his face, his arm, and his hand. ... [He] kept his cool throughout the incident."

During the attack and while being subdued by security, Kim screamed that the rival Koreas should be unified and told reporters that he had attacked Lippert to protest the annual United States–South Korean joint military exercises. Kim has a record of militant Korean nationalist activism; he attacked the Japanese ambassador to South Korea in 2010 and was sentenced to a three-year suspended prison term. On September 11, 2015, Kim was sentenced to twelve years in prison for the attack.

Opposition to THAAD 

The rollout of the Terminal High Altitude Area Defense (THAAD) has been met with domestic opposition in South Korea. The opposition has been on the grounds that the North Korean threat has gone, and on environmental grounds. THAAD was deployed under the administration of ROK President Park Geun-hye. Her opponents accused her of "bow[ing] too readily to America's requests." According to South China Morning Post, when Prime Minister Hwang Kyo-ahn visited Seongju to appease the local backlash against THAAD, demonstrators blocked Hwang's buses and pelted him with eggs and water bottles. The progressive People's Party also opposes the deployment.

The decision to deploy THAAD in South Korea has been opposed and criticized by China and Russia who have accused the US of "destabilizing [the] region." On 30 October 2017, South Korea and China agreed to normalize relations, which had rifted due to THAAD deployment. South Korea's economic dependence on China has been a source of friction for the Korea-US alliance. In April 2020, the National Assembly speaker Moon Hee‐sang declared that asking the ROK to choose between China and America was like “asking a child whether you like your dad or your mom.” He said that South Korea cannot leave aside his economic interests for the sake of security, and vice versa.

Economic relations 

South Korea has experienced significant economic growth in the years since the Korean War, sometimes referred to as the Miracle on the Han River.

As of 2019, China is the ROK's largest trading partner, leading Japan (2nd) and the United States (3rd). Exports to the United States have fallen from 40 percent in the late 1980s to less than 20 percent in 2002.

Disputes 
There remains some major trade disputes between the ROK and the US in the areas including telecommunications, automotive industry, intellectual property rights issues, pharmaceutical industry, and the agricultural industry.

South Korea's export-driven economy and competition with domestic U.S. producers in certain fields of products have led to some trade friction with the United States. For example, imports of certain steel and non-steel products have been subject to U.S. anti-dumping and countervailing duty investigations. A total of 29 U.S. imports from South Korea have been assessed.

Cultural exchange 
The South Korean government maintains Korean cultural education centers in: Wheeling, Illinois (near Chicago), Houston, New York City, Los Angeles, San Francisco, and Washington, DC.

See also 

 United States–Korea Free Trade Agreement
 United States Army Military Government in Korea (USAMGIK, 1945–1948)
 Six-party talks

References

Further reading 
 Baldwin, Frank, ed. Without Parallel: The American-Korean Relationship since 1945 (1973).
 Berger, Carl. The Korean Knot: A Military-Political History (U of Pennsylvania Press, 1964).
 Chay, Jongsuk. Diplomacy of Asymmetry: Korea-American Relations to 1910 (U of Hawaii Press, 1990).
 Chung, Jae Ho. Between Ally and Partner: Korea-China Relations and the United States (2008) excerpt and text search
 Cumings, Bruce. The Origins of the Korean War: Liberation and the Emergence of Separate Regimes, 1945–1947 (Princeton UP, 1981).
 Cumings, Bruce.  ed. Child of Conflict: The Korean-American Relationship, 1943–1953 (U of Washington Press, 1983).
 Dennett, Tyler. "Early American Policy in Korea, 1883-7." Political Science Quarterly 38.1 (1923): 82–103. in JSTOR
 Denett, Tyler. Americans in East Asia: A Critical Study of the Policy of the United States with References to China, Japan, and Korea in the Nineteenth Century. (1922)  online free

 Han, Jongwoo.  The Metamorphosis of U.S.-Korea Relations: The Korean Question Revisited (2022) excerpt

 Harrington, Fred Harvey. God, Mammon, and the Japanese: Dr. Horace N. Allen and Korean- American Relations, 1884–1905. (U of Wisconsin Press, 1944).
 Heo, Uk and Terence Roehrig. 2018. The Evolution of the South Korea-United States Alliance. Cambridge University Press.
Hong, Hyun Woong. "American Foreign Policy Toward Korea, 1945–1950" (PhD dissertation, Oklahoma State University, 2007) online   bibliography pp 256–72.
 Kim, Byung-Kook; Vogel, Ezra F. The Park Chung Hee Era: The Transformation of South Korea (Harvard UP, 2011).
 Kim, Claudia J. (2019) "Military alliances as a stabilising force: U.S. relations with South Korea and Taiwan, 1950s–1960s." Journal of Strategic Studies
 Kim, Mikyoung. "Ethos and Contingencies: A Comparative Analysis of the Clinton and Bush Administrations' North Korea Policy." Korea and World affairs 31.2 (2007): 172–203.
 Kim, Seung-young, ed. American Diplomacy and Strategy toward Korea and Northeast Asia, 1882 – 1950 and After (2009) online
 Lee, Yur-Bok and Wayne Patterson. One Hundred Years of Korean-American Relations, 1882–1982 (1986) 
 Matray, James I. ed. East Asia and the United States: An Encyclopedia of relations since 1784 (2 vol. Greenwood, 2002). excerpt v 2
 Ryu, Dae Young. "An Odd Relationship: The State Department, Its Representatives, and American Protestant Missionaries in Korea, 1882—1905." Journal of American-East Asian Relations 6.4 (1997): 261–287.
 Yuh, Leighanne. "The Historiography of Korea in the United States". International Journal of Korean History  (2010). 15#2: 127–144.

External links

 Republic of Korea Embassy in Washington, D.C.
  U.S. Embassy in Seoul
 Video on South Korea-US Relations from the Dean Peter Krogh Foreign Affairs Digital Archives

 
United States
Bilateral relations of the United States
South
Articles containing video clips